Swansong for You is the second studio album by Isobel Campbell's solo project, The Gentle Waves. It was originally released through Jeepster Records on 6 November 2000. It peaked at number 13 on the CMJ Radio 200 chart.

Track listing

Personnel
Credits adapted from liner notes.
 Isobel Campbell – lead vocals, Cello, instrumentation
 Neil Humphrey – guitar (1)
 Pippa Tunnell – harp (1, 9)
 Nicola Boag – viola (1, 10)
 Greg Lawson – violin (1, 10)
 Clare McKeown – violin (1, 10)
 Murray Fergusson – violin (1 to 3, 10)
 Alastair Savage – violin (1, 3, 10)
 Paul Leonard-Morgan – string arrangement (1, 2, 10)
 Stuart Murdoch – bass guitar, violin arrangement (2 to 8, 10)
 Jonny Quinn – drums, percussion (2, 6)
 Cheryl Crockett – violin (3)
 Rozanne Suarez – backing vocals (3, 5, 7, 9)
 Ryan Smith – double bass (3, 5, 7, 9)
 Mick Cooke – guitar, trumpet, glockenspiel (3 to 8)
 Richard Colburn – drums, percussion (3 to 8)
 Chris Geddes – organ, piano (4 to 8)
 Stevie Jackson – electric guitar, shaker (4, 5, 7, 8)
 Jenny Divers – saxophone (5)
 Lindsay Watson – trombone (5)
 Diane Carnochan – backing vocals (5, 9)
 Eugene Kelly – backing vocals (6)
 Malcolm McMaster – steel guitar (6)
 Margaret Smith – flute, cymbal (7, 8)
 Ed McFarlane – double bass (8, 9)
 Helen McSherry – cello (10)
 David Scott – acoustic guitar, electric guitar (10)
 Ross McFarlane – drums, percussion (10)

References

External links
 

2000 albums
Isobel Campbell albums
Jeepster Records albums